Will D. Davis (born 16 March 1990) is an English professional rugby union player who plays for Ealing Trailfinders as a Prop.

References

External links
Northampton Saints profile

1990 births
Living people
English rugby union players
Northampton Saints players
Rugby union props
Stourbridge R.F.C. players
Bristol Bears players
Cinderford R.F.C. players
Ealing Trailfinders Rugby Club players
Rugby union players from Bristol